Ballykelly railway station served the villages of Ballykelly and Walworth in County Londonderry in Northern Ireland.

The Londonderry and Coleraine Railway opened the station on 29 December 1852.

It closed on 20 September 1954.

Northern Ireland Railways are currently constructing a new passing loop at Ballykelly to help increase service frequency on the Belfast-Derry railway line.

There have been calls to reopen the station at Ballykelly, given its proximity to Limavady.

Routes

References

Disused railway stations in County Londonderry
Railway stations opened in 1852
Railway stations closed in 1954
1852 establishments in Ireland

Railway stations in Northern Ireland opened in 1852